This is a list of notable painters from, or associated with, India.
Please add only those artists that have Wikipedia articles.  All others will be removed.

A
Amrita Sher-Gil
Anjolie Ela Menon
Abanindranath Tagore
Amit Dutt (painter)

B
Bikash Bhattacharjee
Benode Bihari Mukherjee

G
Ganesh Pyne
Gulam Mohammed Sheikh

H
M. F. Husain
Haku Shah

J
Jamini Roy
Jayant Parikh
Jeeva
Jyoti Bhatt

K
K. G. Subramanyan

M
Manjit Bawa
Ananta Mandal
Manaku

N
Nandalal Bose
Narayan Shridhar Bendre
Nainsukh

R
Raja Ravi Varma
A. Ramachandran
Ramkinkar Baij
Ratan Parimoo
Rabindranath Tagore

S
Satish Gujral
Shanti Dave
Sheesh Ram
Sudip Roy
Sailoz Mookherjea

India